The Seattle Mariners' 2007 season was their 31st in franchise history.

After spending two and a half seasons managing the Mariners and guiding the team to a  record this season, including a major league-best 25-12 record since May 22, manager Mike Hargrove shocked the team by announcing his resignation prior to a July 1 game against the Toronto Blue Jays.  Hargrove said he could no longer give the same passion or commitment to his bosses and players.  Bench coach John McLaren was named as Hargrove's replacement. The Mariners won eight consecutive games between June 23 and July 1, making Hargrove the first manager since 1900 to resign his position after a winning streak of more than seven games.

The Mariners longest winning streak was eight games between June 23 to July 1, while their longest losing streak was nine, from August 25 to September 2, effectively ending their running for the ALDS.

For the seventh consecutive time in his seven-year career, Ichiro Suzuki was named to the All-Star Game, held at AT&T Park in San Francisco. Closing pitcher J. J. Putz was selected to his first All-Star Game. Suzuki was voted the Most Valuable Player of the All-Star game, going 3-for-3 with a two-run, inside-the-park home run (the first home run in All-Star history to be hit inside the park). Three days after the All-Star game, on July 13, The Mariners announced that they had signed Suzuki to a five-year contract extension with an estimated value of $90 million, making Suzuki the highest-paid player in Mariners history for the second time.

Regular season

Season standings

Record vs. opponents

Roster

Game log

|- style="background-color:#bbffbb"
| 1 || April 2 || Athletics || 4 – 0 || Hernández (1-0) || Haren (0-1) || || 46,003 || 1-0
|- style="background-color:#bbffbb"
| 2 || April 3 || Athletics || 8 – 4 || Mateo (1-0) || Calero (0-1) || || 25,287 || 2-0
|- style="background-color:#ffbbbb"
| 3 || April 4 || Athletics || 9 – 0 || Harden (1-0) || Batista (0-1) || || 22,816 || 2-1
|- style="background-color:#bbbbbb"
| -- || April 6 || @ Indians || colspan=5|Postponed (snow)  || 2-1
|- style="background-color:#bbbbbb"
| -- || April 7 || @ Indians || colspan=5|Postponed (snow)  || 2-1
|- style="background-color:#bbbbbb"
| -- || April 8 || @ Indians || colspan=5|Postponed (snow)  || 2-1
|- style="background-color:#bbbbbb"
| -- || April 9 || @ Indians || colspan=5|Postponed (snow)  || 2-1
|- style="background-color:#ffbbbb"
| 4 || April 10 || @ Red Sox || 14 – 3 || Beckett (2-0) || Weaver (0-1) || || 35,847 || 2-2
|- style="background-color:#bbffbb"
| 5 || April 11 || @ Red Sox || 3 – 0 || Hernández (2-0) || Matsuzaka (1-1) || || 36,630 || 3-2
|- style="background-color:#bbbbbb"
| -- || April 12 || @ Red Sox || colspan=5|Postponed (rain)  || 3-2
|- style="background-color:#ffbbbb"
| 6 || April 13 || Rangers ||5 – 2 || Millwood (2-1) || Washburn (0-1) || Gagné (1) || 25,243 || 3-3
|- style="background-color:#bbffbb"
| 7 || April 14 || Rangers || 8 – 3 || Batista (1-1) || Padilla (0-3) || || 25,954 || 4-3
|- style="background-color:#bbffbb"
| 8 || April 15 || Rangers || 14 – 6 || Ramírez (1-0) || McCarthy (1-2) || || 25,001 || 5-3
|- style="background-color:#ffbbbb"
| 9 || April 17 || Twins || 11 – 2 || Ortiz (3-0) || Weaver (0-2) || || 19,015 || 5-4
|- style="background-color:#ffbbbb"
| 10 || April 18 || Twins || 5 – 4 || Silva (1-1) || Hernández (2-1) || Nathan (4) ||20,871 || 5-5
|- style="background-color:#ffbbbb"
| 11 || April 19 || Twins || 6 – 5 || Santana (3-1) || Washburn (0-2) || Nathan (5) || 19,350 || 5-6
|- style="background-color:#ffbbbb"
| 12 || April 20 || @ Angels || 8 – 4 || Saunders (2-0) || Batista (1-2) || Rodríguez (5) || 43,359 || 5-7
|- style="background-color:#ffbbbb"
| 13 || April 21 || @ Angels || 7 – 6 || Colón (1-0) || Ramírez (1-1) || Rodríguez (6) || 41,752 || 5-8
|- style="background-color:#ffbbbb"
| 14 || April 22 || @ Angels || 6 – 1 || Santana (2-2) || Weaver (0-3) || || 43,628 || 5-9
|- style="background-color:#bbffbb"
| 15 || April 23 || @ Rangers || 5 – 4 || Morrow (1-0) || Millwood (2-3) || Putz (1) || 26,592 || 6-9
|- style="background-color:#bbbbbb"
| -- || April 24 || @ Rangers || colspan=5|Postponed (rain)  || 6-9
|- style="background-color:#bbffbb"
| 16 || April 25 || @ Athletics || 2 – 0 || Washburn (1-2) || Blanton (2-1) ||  || 19,674 || 7-9
|- style="background-color:#bbffbb"
| 17 || April 26 || @ Athletics || 4 – 2 || Batista (2-2) || Calero (0-2) || Putz (2) || 14,683 || 8-9
|- style="background-color:#bbffbb"
| 18 || April 27 || Royals || 7 – 4 || Ramírez (2-1) || de la Rosa (2-2) || Putz (3) || 37,281 || 9-9
|- style="background-color:#ffbbbb"
| 19 || April 28 || Royals || 8 – 3 || Meche (2-1) || Weaver (0-4) || Duckworth (1) || 32,441 || 9-10
|- style="background-color:#bbffbb"
| 20 || April 29 || Royals || 5 – 1 || Morrow (2-0) || Bannister (0-1) ||  || 26,019 || 10-10

|- style="background-color:#bbffbb"
| 21 || May 1 || White Sox || 5 – 2 || Washburn (2-2) || Vázquez (2-1) || Putz (4) || 20,739 || 11-10
|- style="background-color:#bbffbb"
| 22 || May 2 || White Sox || 3 – 2 || Batista (3-2) || Danks (0-4) || Putz (5) || 16,555 || 12-10
|- style="background-color:#ffbbbb"
| 23 || May 3 || @ Red Sox || 8 – 7 || Donnelly (1-1) || Reitsma (0-1) || Romero (1) || 37,216 || 12-11
|- style="background-color:#bbffbb"
| 24 || May 4 || @ Yankees || 15 – 11 || O'Flaherty (1-0) || Bean (0-1) || Putz (6) || 49,519 || 13-11
|- style="background-color:#ffbbbb"
| 25 || May 5 || @ Yankees || 8 – 1|| Wang (1-2) || Weaver (0-5) || || 51,702 || 13-12
|- style="background-color:#ffbbbb"
| 26 || May 6 || @ Yankees || 5 – 0|| Rasner (1-1) || Washburn (2-3) || || 52,553 || 13-13
|- style="background-color:#bbffbb"
| 27 || May 7 || @ Yankees || 3 – 2 || Sherrill (1-0) || Rivera (1-3) || Putz (7) || 47,424 || 14-13
|- style="background-color:#ffbbbb"
| 28 || May 8 || @ Tigers || 9 – 7 || Bonderman (2-0) || Ramírez (2-2) || Jones (13) || 30,171 || 14-14
|- style="background-color:#bbffbb"
| 29 || May 9 || @ Tigers || 9 – 2 || Baek (1-0) || Robertson (3-2)  || || 27,377 || 15-14
|- style="background-color:#ffbbbb"
| 30 || May 10 || @ Tigers || 7 – 3 || Verlander (3-1) || Weaver (0-6) || || 37,359 || 15-15
|- style="background-color:#bbffbb"
| 31 || May 11 || Yankees || 3 – 0 || Washburn (3-3) || Rasner (2-1) || Putz (8) || 44,214 || 16-15
|- style="background-color:#ffbbbb"
| 32 || May 12 || Yankees || 7 – 2  || DeSalvo (1-0) || Batista (3-3) || || 46,153 || 16-16
|- style="background-color:#bbffbb"
| 33 || May 13 || Yankees || 2 – 1 || Ramírez (3-2) || Pettitte (2-2)|| Putz (9) || 46,181 || 17-16
|- style="background-color:#bbffbb"
| 34 || May 15 || Angels || 11 – 3 || White (1-0) || Escobar (4-2) || || 21,769 || 18-16
|- style="background-color:#ffbbbb"
| 35 || May 16 || Angels || 5 – 0 || Lackey (6-3) || Baek (1-1) || || 22,331 || 18-17
|- style="background-color:#ffbbbb"
| 36 || May 17 || Angels || 7 – 3 || Colón (5-0) || Washburn (3-4) ||  || 20,488 || 18-18
|- style="background-color:#ffbbbb"
| 37 || May 18 || Padres || 8 – 1 || Young (5-3) || Batista (3-4) ||  || 39,531 || 18-19
|- style="background-color:#bbffbb"
| 38 || May 19 || Padres || 7 – 4 || Ramírez (4-2) || Maddux (3-3) || Putz (10) || 34,287 || 19-19
|- style="background-color:#ffbbbb"
| 39 || May 20 || Padres || 2 – 1 || Germano (2-0) || Hernández (2-2) || Hoffman (11) || 38,844 || 19-20
|- style="background-color:#ffbbbb"
| 40 || May 21 || @ Indians || 5 – 2 || Mastny (3-1) || Baek (1-2) || Borowski (14) || 38,645 || 19-21
|- style="background-color:#bbffbb"
| 41 || May 22 || @ Devil Rays || 5 – 2 || Washburn (4-4) || Orvella (0-1) || Putz (11) || 9,254 || 20-21
|- style="background-color:#bbffbb"
| 42 || May 23 || @ Devil Rays || 5 – 1 || Batista (4-4) || Fossum (3-4) || || 8,440 || 21-21
|- style="background-color:#ffbbbb"
| 43 || May 24 || @ Devil Rays || 13 – 12 || Seo (3-4) || White (1-1) || || 9,149 || 21-22
|- style="background-color:#bbffbb"
| 44 || May 25 || @ Royals || 10 – 2 || Hernández (3-2) || Meche (3-3) || || 28,651 || 22-22
|- style="background-color:#bbffbb"
| 45 || May 26 || @ Royals || 9 – 1 || Baek (2-2) || Bannister (0-3) || || 21,138 || 23-22
|- style="background-color:#bbffbb"
| 46 || May 27 || @ Royals || 7 – 4 || Washburn (5-4) || Pérez (2-5) || Putz (12) || 16,091 || 24-22
|- style="background-color:#bbffbb"
| 47 || May 28 || @ Angels || 12 – 5 || Batista (5-4)  || Colón (5-2) ||  || 42,352 || 25-22
|- style="background-color:#ffbbbb"
| 48 || May 29 || @ Angels || 4 – 1 || Santana (4-6) || Feierabend (0-1) || Rodríguez (17) || 38,174 || 25-23
|- style="background-color:#ffbbbb"
| 49 || May 30 || @ Angels || 8 – 6 || Moseley (4-0) || Hernández (3-3) || Rodríguez (18) || 39,288 || 25-24
|- style="background-color:#bbffbb"
| 50 || May 31 || Rangers || 9 – 5 || Baek (3-2) || Padilla (2-8) ||  || 20,137 || 26-24

|- style="background-color:#ffbbbb"
| 51 || June 1 || Rangers || 9 – 8 || Benoit (2-1) || Green (0-1) || Gagné (4) || 34,570 || 26-25
|- style="background-color:#bbffbb"
| 52 || June 2 || Rangers || 5 – 4 || Batista (6-4) || Loe (1-5) || Putz (13) || 41,988 || 27-25
|- style="background-color:#bbffbb"
| 53 || June 3 || Rangers || 11 – 6 || Feierabend (1-1) || Tejeda (4-6) || || 36,886 || 28-25
|- style="background-color:#bbffbb"
| 54 || June 4 || Orioles || 7 – 4 || Sherrill (2-0) || Bradford (0-2) || Putz (14) || 19,090 || 29-25
|- style="background-color:#bbffbb"
| 55 || June 5 || Orioles || 5 – 4 || Davis (1-0) || Walker (1-1) || Putz (15) || 19,287 || 30-25
|- style="background-color:#ffbbbb"
| 56 || June 6 || Orioles || 9 – 5 || Cabrera (5-6) || Washburn (5-5) ||  || 29,010 || 30-26
|- style="background-color:#bbffbb"
| 57 || June 8 || @ Padres || 6 – 5  || O'Flaherty (2-0) || Meredith (2-4) || Putz (16) || 44,325 || 31-26
|- style="background-color:#bbffbb"
| 58 || June 9 || @ Padres || 6 – 5 || Green (1-1) || Brocail (2-1) || Putz (17) || 37,178 || 32-36
|- style="background-color:#bbffbb"
| 59 || June 10 || @ Padres || 4 – 3 || Batista (7-4) || Hoffman (2-3) || Putz (18)  || 35,950 || 33-26
|- style="background-color:#bbffbb"
| 60 || June 11 || @ Indians || 8 – 7 || Morrow (3-0) || Borowski (0-3) ||  || 22,325 || 34-26
|- style="background-color:#bbffbb"
| 61 || June 12 || @ Cubs || 5 – 3  || O'Flaherty (3-0) || Ohman (0-4) || Putz (19) || 40,071 || 35-26
|- style="background-color:#ffbbbb"
| 62 || June 13 || @ Cubs || 3 – 2 || Marshall (3-2) || Batista (7-5) || Dempster (14) || 40,163 || 35-27
|- style="background-color:#ffbbbb"
| 63 || June 14 || @ Cubs || 5 – 4 || Howry (3-3) || Morrow (3-1) || || 39,846 || 35-28
|- style="background-color:#ffbbbb"
| 64 || June 15 || @ Astros || 5 – 1 || Rodríguez (4-6) || Hernández (3-4) || || 37,322 || 35-29
|- style="background-color:#ffbbbb"
| 65 || June 16 || @ Astros || 9 – 4 || Williams (3-9) || Baek (3-3) || || 41,974 || 35-30
|- style="background-color:#ffbbbb"
| 66 || June 17 || @ Astros || 10 – 3 || Oswalt (7-4) || Washburn (5-6) || || 42,019 || 35-31
|- style="background-color:#ffbbbb"
| 67 || June 19 || Pirates || 5 – 3 || Gorzelanny (7-4) || Batista (7-6) || Chacón (1) || 24,520 || 35-32
|- style="background-color:#bbffbb"
| 68 || June 20 || Pirates || 7 – 0 ||  Weaver (1-6) || Maholm (3-10) || || 23,553 || 36-32
|- style="background-color:#bbffbb"
| 69 || June 21 || Pirates || 3 – 0 || Hernández (4-4) || Van Benschoten (0-2) || Putz (20) || 22,950 || 37-32
|- style="background-color:#ffbbbb"
| 70 || June 22 || Reds || 16 – 1 || Harang (8-2) || Feierabend (1-2) || || 46,340 || 37-33
|- style="background-color:#bbffbb"
| 71 || June 23 || Reds || 9 – 1 || Washburn (6-6) || Lohse (3-10) ||  || 45,939 || 38-33
|- style="background-color:#bbffbb"
| 72 || June 24 || Reds || 3 – 2 || O'Flaherty (4-0) || Arroyo (2-9) || Putz (21) || 46,064 || 39-33
|- style="background-color:#bbffbb"
| 73 || June 25 || Red Sox || 9 – 5 || Weaver (2-6) || Tavárez (5-5) ||  || 33,830 || 40-33
|- style="background-color:#bbffbb"
| 74 || June 26 || Red Sox || 8 – 7 || O'Flaherty (5-0) || López (1-1) || Putz (22) || 35,045 || 41-33
|- style="background-color:#bbffbb"
| 75 || June 27 || Red Sox || 2 – 1  || Davis (2-0)|| Piñeiro (1-1) || || 43,448 || 42-33
|- style="background-color:#bbffbb"
| 76 || June 29 || Blue Jays || 5 – 3 || Washburn (7-6) || McGowan (4-4) || Putz (23) || 41,862 || 43-33
|- style="background-color:#bbffbb"
| 77 || June 30 || Blue Jays || 8 – 3 || Batista (8-6) || Halladay (9-3) || || 36,102 || 44-33

|- style="background-color:#bbffbb"
| 78 || July 1 || Blue Jays || 2 – 1 || Putz (1-0) || Accardo (1-3) || || 38,778 || 45-33
|- style="background-color:#ffbbbb"
| 79 || July 2 || @ Royals ||  3 – 2  || Dotel (1-1) || Morrow (3-2) || || 13,257 || 45-34
|- style="background-color:#ffbbbb"
| 80 || July 3 || @ Royals || 17 – 3 || de la Rosa (6-9) || Feierabend (1-3) || || 28,140 || 45-35
|- style="background-color:#bbffbb"
| 81 || July 4 || @ Royals || 4 – 0 || Washburn (8-6) || Bannister (5-5) || Putz (24) || 27,797 || 46-35
|- style="background-color:#ffbbbb"
| 82 || July 5 || @ Athletics || 3 – 2 || Gaudin (8-3) || Batista (8-7) || Embree (9) || 15,654 || 46-36
|- style="background-color:#bbffbb"
| 83 || July 6 || @ Athletics || 7 – 1 || O'Flaherty (6-0) || Haren (10-3) || || 19,158 || 47-36
|- style="background-color:#bbffbb"
| 84 || July 7 || @ Athletics || 4 – 0 || Hernández (5-4) || Harden (1-2) || || 29,225 || 48-36
|- style="background-color:#bbffbb"
| 85 || July 8 || @ Athletics || 7 – 3 || Green (2-1) || Blanton (8-5) || || 27,059 || 49-36
|- style="background-color:#bbffbb"
| 86 || July 12 || Tigers || 3 – 2 || Hernández (6-4) || Miller (4-3) || Putz (25) || 31,994 || 50-36
|- style="background-color:#ffbbbb"
| 87 || July 13 || Tigers || 6 – 3 || Bonderman (10-1) || Washburn (8-7) || Jones (23) || 37,393 || 50-37
|- style="background-color:#bbffbb"
| 88 || July 14 || Tigers || 6 – 4 || Batista (9-7) || Rogers (3-1) || Putz (26) || 38,202 || 51-37
|- style="background-color:#ffbbbb"
| 89 || July 15 || Tigers || 11 – 7 || Verlander (11-3) || Weaver (2-7) || || 39,073 || 51-38
|- style="background-color:#bbffbb"
| 90 || July 16 || Orioles || 4 – 2 || Ramírez (5-2) || Burres (4-4) || Putz (27) || 23,128 || 52-38
|- style="background-color:#ffbbbb"
| 91 || July 17 || Orioles || 8 – 3 || Guthrie (5-3) || Hernández (6-5) ||  || 22,470 || 52-39
|- style="background-color:#bbffbb"
| 92 || July 18 || Orioles || 6 – 5 || Green (3-1) || Báez (0-5) || Putz (28) || 28,550 || 53-39
|- style="background-color:#bbffbb"
| 93 || July 20 || @ Blue Jays || 4 – 2|| Batista (10-7) || Litsch (2-4) || Putz (29) || 27,079 || 54-39
|- style="background-color:#ffbbbb"
| 94 || July 21 || @ Blue Jays || 1 – 0 || Towers (5-6) || Weaver (2-8) ||  Accardo (15) || 28,921 ||54-40
|- style="background-color:#ffbbbb"
| 95 || July 22 || @ Blue Jays || 8 – 0 || Halladay (11-4) || Hernández (6-6) || || 29,083 || 54-41
|- style="background-color:#ffbbbb"
| 96 || July 23 || @ Rangers || 8 – 7 || Millwood (7-8) || Ramírez (5-3) || || 20,584 || 54-42
|- style="background-color:#ffbbbb"
| 97 || July 24 || @ Rangers || 2 – 1  || Rheinecker (1-0) || Feierabend (1-4) || Gagné (15) || 26,842 || 54-43
|- style="background-color:#ffbbbb"
| 98 || July 24 || @ Rangers || 4 – 3 || Wilson (2-1)|| Reitsma (0-2) || Gagné (16) || 26,842 || 54-44
|- style="background-color:#ffbbbb"
| 99 || July 25 || @ Rangers || 7 – 6 || Benoit (4-3) || Putz (1-1) || || 34,853 || 54-45
|- style="background-color:#ffbbbb"
| 100 || July 26 || Athletics || 6 – 2 || Haren (12-3) || Weaver (2-9) || || 34,250 || 54-46
|- style="background-color:#bbffbb"
| 101 || July 27 || Athletics || 7 – 1 || Hernández (7-6) || Braden (1-6) || || 37,643 || 55-46
|- style="background-color:#bbffbb"
| 102 || July 28 || Athletics || 4 – 3 || Ramírez (6-3) || Gaudin (8-6) || Putz (30) || 41,260 || 56-46
|- style="background-color:#bbffbb"
| 103 || July 29 || Athletics || 14 – 10 || Green (4-1) || Street (2-2) || || 41,961 || 57-46
|- style="background-color:#bbffbb"
| 104 || July 30 || Angels || 2 – 0 || Batista (11-7) || Escobar (11-5) || Putz (31) || 31,232 || 58-46
|- style="background-color:#ffbbbb"
| 105 || July 31 || Angels || 8 – 0 || Lackey (13-6) || Weaver (2-10) || || 28,903 || 58-47

|- style="background-color:#bbffbb"
| 106 || August 1 || Angels || 8 – 7  || O'Flaherty (7-0) || Speier (0-2) || || 34,471 || 59-47
|- style="background-color:#bbffbb"
| 107 || August 3 || Red Sox || 7 – 4 || Green (5-1) || Timlin (1-1) || Putz (32) || 46,235 || 60-47
|- style="background-color:#ffbbbb"
| 108 || August 4 || Red Sox || 4 – 3 || Matsuzaka (13-8) || Washburn (8-8) || Papelbon (25) || 46,313 || 60-48
|- style="background-color:#ffbbbb"
| 109 || August 5 || Red Sox ||  9 – 2 || Beckett (14-5) || Batista (11-8) ||  ||  46,377 || 60-49
|- style="background-color:#bbffbb"
| 110 || August 7 || @ Orioles || 10 – 3 || Weaver (3-10) || Walker (1-2) ||  || 25,060 || 61-49
|- style="background-color:#bbffbb"
| 111 || August 8 || @ Orioles || 8 – 4 || Hernández (8-6) || Guthrie (7-4) || Putz (33) || 17,511 || 62-49
|- style="background-color:#bbffbb"
| 112 || August 9 || @ Orioles || 13 – 8 || Ramírez (7-3) || Cabrera (8-12) || Sherrill (1) || 18,679 || 63-49
|- style="background-color:#ffbbbb"
| 113 || August 10 || @ White Sox || 5 – 3 || Vázquez (10-6) || Washburn (8-9) || Jenks (33) || 38,586 || 63-50
|- style="background-color:#bbffbb"
| 114 || August 11 || @ White Sox || 7 – 6 || Batista (12-8) || Floyd (1-2) || Putz (34) || 38,210 || 64-50
|- style="background-color:#bbffbb"
| 115 || August 12 || @ White Sox || 6 – 0 || Weaver (4-10) || Danks (6-10) || || 36,629 || 65-50
|- style="background-color:#bbffbb"
| 116 || August 13 || Twins || 4 – 3 || Putz (2-1) || Guerrier (1-4) || || 37,902 || 66-50
|- style="background-color:#ffbbbb"
| 117 || August 14 || Twins || 11 – 3 || Garza || Ramírez (7-4) ||  || 33,729 || 66-51
|- style="background-color:#ffbbbb"
| 118 || August 15 || Twins || 6 – 1 || Neshek (7-2) || Washburn (8-10) || || 42,921 || 66-52
|- style="background-color:#bbffbb"
| 119 || August 17 || White Sox || 5 – 4 || Batista (13-8) || Contreras (6-15) || Putz (35) || 46,170 || 67-52
|- style="background-color:#bbffbb"
| 120 || August 18 || White Sox || 7 – 5 || Weaver (5-10) || Danks (6-11) || Putz (36) || 41,121 || 68-52
|- style="background-color:#bbffbb"
| 121 || August 19 || White Sox || 11 – 5 || Hernández (9-6) || Garland (8-9) || || 45,668 || 69-52
|- style="background-color:#bbffbb"
| 122 || August 20 || @ Twins || 9 – 4 || Ramírez (8-4) || Garza (2-4) || || 31,755 || 70-52
|- style="background-color:#bbffbb"
| 123 || August 21 || @ Twins || 7 – 2 || Washburn (9-10) || Baker (6-6) || || 42,373 || 71-52
|- style="background-color:#ffbbbb"
| 124 || August 22 || @ Twins || 8 – 4 || Silva (10-12) || Batista (13-9) || || 29,881 || 71-53
|- style="background-color:#bbffbb"
| 125 || August 23 || @ Rangers || 9 – 4 || Weaver (6-10) || Loe (6-10) || || 26,963 || 72-53
|- style="background-color:#bbffbb"
| 126 || August 24 || @ Rangers || 4 – 2 || Hernández (10-6) || Millwood (8-11) || Putz (37) || 32,716 || 73-53
|- style="background-color:#ffbbbb"
| 127 || August 25 || @ Rangers || 5 – 3 || Benoit (7-3) || White (1-1) || Wilson (8) || 47,977 || 73-54
|- style="background-color:#ffbbbb"
| 128 || August 26 || @ Rangers || 5 – 3 || Padilla (4-9) || Washburn (9-11) || || 25,437 || 73-55
|- style="background-color:#ffbbbb"
| 129 || August 27 || Angels || 6 – 0 || Lackey (16-8) || Batista (13-10) || || 45,998 || 73-56
|- style="background-color:#ffbbbb"
| 130 || August 28 || Angels || 10 – 6 || Speier (2-3) || Morrow (3-3) || || 44,395 || 73-57
|- style="background-color:#ffbbbb"
| 131 || August 29 || Angels || 8 – 2 || Weaver (10-6) || Hernández (10-7) || || 46,047 || 73-58
|- style="background-color:#ffbbbb"
| 132 || August 30 || @ Indians || 6 – 5 || Borowski (3-5) || O'Flaherty (7-1) || || 25,949 || 73-59
|- style="background-color:#ffbbbb"
| 133 || August 31 || @ Blue Jays || 7 – 5 || Marcum (12-5) || Washburn (9-12) || Accardo (26) || 34,518 || 73-60

|- style="background-color:#ffbbbb"
| 134 || September 1 || @ Blue Jays || 2 – 1 || McGowan (9-8) || Green (5-2) || Accardo (27) || 30,672 || 73-61
|- style="background-color:#ffbbbb"
| 135 || September 2 || @ Blue Jays || 6 – 4 || Burnett (8-7) || Weaver (6-11) || Janssen (5) || 32,166 || 73-62
|- style="background-color:#bbffbb"
| 136 || September 3 || @ Yankees || 7 – 1 || Hernández (11-7) || Clemens (6-6) || || 54,522 || 74-62
|- style="background-color:#ffbbbb"
| 137 || September 4 || @ Yankees || 12 – 3 || Wang (17-6) || Ramírez (8-5) || || 52,487 || 74-63
|- style="background-color:#ffbbbb"
| 138 || September 5 || @ Yankees || 10 – 2 || Chamberlain (1-0) || Washburn (9-13) || || 52,538 || 74-64
|- style="background-color:#ffbbbb"
| 139 || September 7 || @ Tigers || 6 – 1 || Verlander (16-5) || Batista (13-11) || || 39,750 || 74-65
|- style="background-color:#ffbbbb"
| 140 || September 8 || @ Tigers || 12 – 6 || Miner (3-3) || Weaver (6-12) || || 42,184 || 74-66
|- style="background-color:#bbffbb"
| 141 || September 9 || @ Tigers || 14 – 7 || Hernández (12-7) || Bonderman (11-9) || || 39,990 || 75-66
|- style="background-color:#ffbbbb"
| 142 || September 10 || Athletics || 9 – 3 || Blanton (13-9) || Ramírez (8-6) || Street (13) || 29,698 || 75-67
|- style="background-color:#ffbbbb"
| 143 || September 11 || Athletics || 7 – 4 || Lugo (6-0) || Washburn (9-14) || Street (14) || 26,676 || 75-68
|- style="background-color:#bbffbb"
| 144 || September 12 || Athletics || 6 – 5 || Putz (3-1) || Brown (2-2) || || 26,194 || 76-68
|- style="background-color:#bbffbb"
| 145 || September 13 || Devil Rays || 8 – 7 || Rowland-Smith (1-0) || Wheeler (1-8) || Putz (38) || 23,991 || 77-68
|- style="background-color:#bbffbb"
| 146 || September 14 || Devil Rays || 2 – 1 || Putz (4-1) || Glover (5-5) || || 30,164 || 78-68
|- style="background-color:#ffbbbb"
| 147 || September 15 || Devil Rays || 6 – 2 || Kazmir (13-8) || Ramírez (8-7) || || 33,793 || 78-69
|- style="background-color:#ffbbbb"
| 148 || September 16 || Devil Rays || 9 – 2 || Sonnanstine (6-9) || Washburn (9-15) || || 36,234 || 78-70
|- style="background-color:#bbffbb"
| 149 || September 17 || @ Athletics || 4 – 0 || Batista (14-11) || Haren (14-8) || || 17,228 || 79-70
|- style="background-color:#bbffbb"
| 150 || September 18 || @ Athletics || 8 – 7 || Weaver (7-12) || Gaudin (11-12) || Sherrill (2) || 18,145 || 80-70
|- style="background-color:#bbffbb"
| 151 || September 19 || @ Athletics || 9 – 5 || Hernández (13-7) || Meyer (0-2) || || 21,171 || 81-70
|- style="background-color:#ffbbbb"
| 152 || September 20 || @ Angels || 9 – 5 || Weaver (13-7) || Feierabend (1-5) || || 40,016 || 81-71
|- style="background-color:#bbffbb"
| 153 || September 21 || @ Angels || 6 – 0 || Washburn (10-15) || Saunders (8-4) || || 44,018 || 82-71
|- style="background-color:#bbffbb"
| 154 || September 22 || @ Angels || 3 – 2 || Batista (15-11) || Colón (6-8) || Putz (39) || 43,583 || 83-71
|- style="background-color:#ffbbbb"
| 155 || September 23 || @ Angels || 7 – 4 || Lackey (18-9) || Weaver (7-13) || Rodríguez (38) || 44,234 || 83-72
|- style="background-color:#ffbbbb"
| 156 || September 25 || Indians || 4 – 3  || Mastny (7-2) || Morrow (3-4) || Betancourt (3) || 22,200 || 83-73
|- style="background-color:#ffbbbb"
| 157 || September 26 || @ Indians* || 12 – 4 || Carmona (19-8) || Feierabend (1-6) || || n/a || 83-74
|- style="background-color:#bbffbb"
| 158 || September 26 || Indians || 3 – 2  || Putz (5-1) || Fultz (4-3) || || 26,801 || 84-74
|- style="background-color:#bbffbb"
| 159 || September 27 || Indians || 4 – 2 || Baek (4-3) || Byrd (15-8) || Sherrill (3) || 21,285 || 85-74
|- style="background-color:#bbffbb"
| 160 || September 28 || Rangers || 6 – 4 || Putz (6-1) || Wood (3-2) || || 31,954 || 86-74
|- style="background-color:#bbffbb"
| 161 || September 29 || Rangers || 5 – 1 || Batista (16-11) || Millwood (10-14) || || 26,799 || 87-74
|- style="background-color:#bbffbb"
| 162 || September 30 || Rangers || 4 – 2 || Hernández (14-7) || Murray (1-2) || Putz (40) || 30,442 || 88-74
|-
| colspan=8 | *At Safeco Field in Seattle, Washington

Player stats

Regular batters

Note: G = Games played; AB = At bats; H = Hits; Avg. = Batting average; HR = Home runs; RBI = Runs batted in

Other batters
Note: G = Games played; AB = At bats; H = Hits; Avg. = Batting average; HR = Home runs; RBI = Runs batted in

Pitching

Starting pitchers
Note: GS = Games started; IP = Innings pitched; W = Wins; L = Losses; ERA = Earned run average; SO = Strikeouts

Relief pitchers
Note: G = Games pitched; IP = Innings pitched; SV = Saves; W = Wins; L = Losses; H = Hits; ERA = Earned run average; SO = Strikeouts

Farm system

LEAGUE CHAMPIONS: AZL Mariners

Major League Baseball Draft

The following is a list of 2002 Seattle Mariners draft picks. The Mariners took part in the June regular draft, also known as the Rule 4 draft. The Mariners made 50 selections in the 2002 draft, the first being outfielder John Mayberry, Jr. in the first round. In all, the Mariners selected 23 pitchers, 12 outfielders, 5 catchers, 3 second basemen, 3 shortstops, 3 third basemen, 3 second basemen, and 1 first baseman.

Draft

Key

Table

References

Game Logs:
1st Half: Seattle Mariners Game Log on ESPN.com
2nd Half: Seattle Mariners Game Log on ESPN.com
Batting Statistics: Seattle Mariners Batting Stats on ESPN.com
Pitching Statistics: Seattle Mariners Pitching Stats on ESPN.com
2007 Seattle Mariners at Baseball Reference

Seattle Mariners seasons
Seattle Mariners season
2007 in sports in Washington (state)